Borislav "Bora" Dugić (born June 10, 1949) is a Serbian musician and flautist having released a number of CDs and records as well as having performed at countless concerts.

Early and professional life 
Bora Dugić finished high school and college in the field of mathematics. Since a young age he played the flute and upon the completion of his high school education he moved to the city of Kragujevac in Central Serbia. There, he became the secretary of the cultural group “Abrašević”. As he continued to become more popular due to his abilities playing the flute, Bora moved to Serbia's capital Belgrade where he joined the grand Folk Orchestra of RTV Belgrade. He is the winner of the October Award, Gold Thimble Award for constant contribution to the culture of Belgrade, and numerous other domestic and international awards.

In 2004 he celebrated 35 years of artistic work, by a grand solo concert name The Play of Spirit at the Sava Centar in Belgrade. In 2008 he appeared at the 2008 Eurovision Song Contest alongside Jelena Tomašević.

Personal life 
Dugić is married to Milanka, who is also involved in music. They have a daughter Jasmina, who is a costume designer and a son Bojan, who graduated from the Berklee College of Music in Boston.

External links 

 Official page of Bora Dugić
 Bora Dugić RTS page

1949 births
Living people
People from Rača
Eurovision Song Contest entrants for Serbia
Eurovision Song Contest entrants of 2008
Serbian flautists
21st-century flautists
Beovizija contestants
Beovizija winners